J. K. K. Nattraja Educational Institutions (JKKNEI) is an educational institution established in 1969 by J. K. K. Rangammal Charitable Trust at Komarapalayam, Namakkal, Tamil Nadu, India.

J. K. K. Nattraja Vidhyalya
Nattraja Vidhyalya, in Komarapalayam, Tamil Nadu, India, is a part of J. K. K. Nattraja Educational Institutions that is run by the J. K. K. Rangammal Charitable Trust. The elementary school was founded in the year 2009. The school is situated in the heart of the Komarapalayam City. The school is recognized by the Government of Tamil Nadu and follows the State approved Syllabus (Samacheer).

J. K. K. Nattraja Matriculation Higher Secondary School

J. K. K. Nattraja Matriculation Higher Secondary School, is a part of J. K. K. Nattraja Educational Institutions. The school was founded by Kodai Vallal Mr. J. K. K. Nattrajah in 1969. The school is situated in the heart of the Komarapalayam City. The school is recognised by the Government of Tamil Nadu and follows the State approved Syllabus (Samacheer). The school has classes from Nursery up to Standard 12.

J. K. K. Nattraja College of Engineering and Technology

J. K. K. Nattraja College of Engineering and Technology is a private engineering college in Komarapalayam, India, affiliated with Anna University and  Approved by AICTE, New Delhi. It is managed by J. K. K. Rangammal Charitable Trust.

Academic undergraduate courses include: B.E.[Computer Science & Engineering]; B.E.[Electronics & Communication Engineering]; B.E.[Electrical & Electronics Engineering]; B.E.[Mechanical Engineering]; B.TECH. [Information Technology].  Postgraduate courses include: M.E [Computer Science & Engineering], Master of Business Administration.

Govt of India's HRD Ministry has selected  JKKN College of Engineering & Technology under 'Unnat Bharat Abhiyan' to bring transformational change in rural development processes in 10 Villages by leveraging knowledge of our institutions in the state of Tamil Nadu.

J. K. K. Nattraja College of Nursing and Research

J. K .K. Nattraja College of Nursing and Research is a private nursing college in Komarapalayam, India. It is managed by J. K. K. Rangammal Charitable Trust, and affiliated to The Tamil Nadu Dr.M.G.R. Medical University, Chennai, recognized by Tamil Nadu State Nurses & Midwives Council, Chennai and Indian Nursing Council, New Delhi.

Courses include: B.Sc.[Nursing], P.B.B.Sc.,(Nursing), M.Sc.[Nursing].

J. K. K. Nattraja College of Pharmacy

J. K. K. Nattraja College of Pharmacy is a private pharmacy college in Komarapalayam, India. It is approved by Pharmacy Council of India for providing B.Pharm, M.Pharm and Pharm D. It is managed by J. K. K. Rangammal Charitable Trust. It was originally approved by AICTE, New Delhi, Pharmacy Council of India, New Delhi and affiliated to The Tamilnadu Dr. M.G.R. Medical University, Chennai.

Courses include B.Pharm (4 years), Master of Pharmacy (2 years), Pharm.D (Doctor of Pharmacy)(6 years)

J. K. K. Nattraja Dental College and Hospital

J. K. K. Nattraja Dental College and Hospital is a private dental college in Komarapalayam, India. It was established in 1987, and it is affiliated to the Tamil Nadu Dr. M.G.R. Medical University, Chennai and recognized by Dental Council of India, New Delhi. It is managed by J.K.K.Rangammal Charitable Trust.

Undergraduate courses include Bachelor of Dental Surgery (BDS); B. Optom; B.Sc. in several allied health science disciplines. Postgraduate courses include: Master of Dental Surgery (MDS).

J. K. K. Nattraja College of Arts & Science

J. K. K. Nattraja College of Arts & Science is a general degree college in Komarapalayam, established in 1974. The college is affiliated with Periyar University. It offers courses in arts, commerce, and science.  The college is recognized by the University Grants Commission (UGC).

J. K. K. Nattraja College of Education

J. K. K. Nattraja College of Education is a private teacher training college in Komarapalayam, India. It is approved by NCTE, Bangalore and TNTEU, Chennai. It is managed by J. K. K. Rangammal Charitable Trust.

Courses include BEd in Tamil, English, Mathematics, Physics, Chemistry, Botany, Zoology, Computer Science, History, Commerce (PG), Economics (PG).

References

External links
Official website

Colleges affiliated to Anna University
Educational institutions established in 1969
1969 establishments in Tamil Nadu
Private schools in Tamil Nadu
Schools in Erode district
Pharmacy schools in India
Colleges in Tamil Nadu
Education in Namakkal district
Dental colleges in India
Nursing schools in India
Educational institutions established in 1974
1974 establishments in Tamil Nadu
Colleges affiliated to Periyar University